Mariana González may refer to:

Mariana González Oliva (born 1976), Argentinian Olympic field hockey player
Mariana González (fencer) (born 1979), Venezuelan Olympic fencer